Garra minimus is a species of cyprinid fish in the genus Garra described from the Ranga River, Lower Subansiri District, Arunachal Pradesh, India.

Etymology
The name minimus came from a Latin word which refers to the small body size of the species.

References 

Garra
Fish described in 2013